Rövershagen station is a railway station in the municipality of Rövershagen, Mecklenburg-Vorpommern, Germany.

References

External links
 

Rovershagen
Rovershagen
Rovershagen